Tidiani Tall (c.1840 – 1888) succeeded his uncle, El Hadj Umar Tall, as head of the Toucouleur Empire following Umar's 1864 death near Bandiagara.

Tidiani Tall also had 4 children: Coumba Tall, Madina Tall, Fadima Tall, and Addafini Abdulahi.

His wife was Aïssatou Hayatou.

Tidiani was born the son of Alfa Amadou Tall, El Hadj Umar's elder brother. While a boy, his father went to Sokoto to visit his brother from his return to pilgrimage. During the  twenty following years, he lived with his uncle and father in Timbo (Futa-Jalon), Jégunko (Futa-Jalon), Dinguiray Futa-Jalon and Nioro Kaarta before settling with his uncle in Hamdullahi, Massina after the victory of the jihadists after the battle of Taayawal (1862).

Tidiani and his cousin Muhammad Makki (c.1835- 1864)( Umar's second son) were de facto the heads of the administrative branches of Hamdullahi. After the rebellion of the Fulas, led by the prince BaLobbo Bari allied with the al-Bekkay of Timbuktu assieged Hamdullahi from June 1863 to February 1864. 

In January 1864, Tijani was sent by his uncle to seek help from the Dogons of Bandiagara and to form a new army.  The alliance led by Balobbo entered in the city at the start of February 1864 and Umar and his closest, including Muhammad bin Jibril Anabwani, escaped on the 6th of that month. On February 11, Tidiani arrived to Déguembéré where his uncle just died with 15 others persons among others his sons, Muhammad Makki, Hadi and Muhammad Mahi.

Tijani succeeded in defeating the alliance in 1864.  Tidiani was by now, more powerful than his cousin Amadou Madani ibn Umar, sultan of Segou.

References 
 B.O. Oloruntimeehin. The Segu Tukulor Empire. Humanities Press, New York (1972). SBN 391002066 
 David Robinson, La guerre sainte d'al-Hajj Umar: Le Soudan Occidental au milieu du XIXe siécle, Karthala, 1988

Toucouleur Empire
1840s births
1888 deaths
History of Mali
People of French West Africa
19th-century rulers in Africa